The Kinner R Playboy was a 1930s American two-seat sporting monoplane built by Kinner Airplane & Motor Corporation.

Design and development
The Playboy was a  two-seat (side-by-side) sporting monoplane designed by Max B. Harlow and built by the Kinner Airplane & Motor Corporation in 1933. Originally built with an enclosed cockpit the sole R was modified to have an open cockpit as the Kinner R-1 Playboy. Production aircraft were designated Kinner R-5 Playboy. one of the 12 built being supplied to the China Aviation Assn (Shanghai), fitted with a  Kinner C-5 engine. The Center for Freedom and Flight in Vacaville, California has one of the two remaining aircraft on display.

Variants
Data from:
Kinner R Playboy
The original closed cockpit version of the Playboy.
Kinner R-1 Playboy
The R modified to have an open cockpit.
Kinner R-5 Playboy
The production version with enclosed cockpit, 12 aircraft were built.

Specifications (R-5)

References

Citations

Bibliography

External links

1930s United States sport aircraft
Low-wing aircraft
Single-engined tractor aircraft
Aircraft first flown in 1933